Evelyn Scott School is located in Denman Prospect in the Australian Capital Territory. It is named after Indigenous Australian activist and educator Evelyn Scott.

The school opened to primary school students in 2021. It will open to high school students in 2023.  The school has been designed to have Zero emissions, with solar panels and double glazed windows.

References

External links
 Evelyn Scott School

High schools in the Australian Capital Territory
Primary schools in the Australian Capital Territory